King Abdulaziz Public Library (KAPL) is a public library in al-Fouta, Riyadh, Saudi Arabia, located adjacent to King Abdulaziz Auditorium and al-Watan Park. Established in December 1999, it is part of the King Abdulaziz Historical Center.

History and profile
The library was founded on 15 December 1999. The building was designed and constructed by Saudi Oger. The building cost $40,000,000.00 to construct and spans an area of 26,000m2. "The architectural character presents a unique formal statement, and it employs local themes and materials reinterpreted using modern technology."

Special collections include the private library of the American Orientalist George Rentz, the library of Hamza Bu Bakr (made up of 17,170 titles in 19,281 volumes) and a collection of over 7,000 rare Arab and Islamic coins.

The KAPL has 5,271 rare Arabic titles cataloged, classified and entered into the Arabic books database, as well as 3,000 rare Arabic books currently being cataloged.

The KAPL also has one of the rarest collections of photographs in the world. This collection shares a total of 5,564 single original photographs taken by the most famous photographers of the East and the Arab world since the beginning of photography in 1740. The photos are also taken by travelers, sea captains, military personnel and more.

Arabic Union Catalog
In 2006 the library created the Arabic Union Catalog. This is shared with OCLC, and is available on their WorldCat database.

Map Collection
"One of the largest publicly available Arabian cartographic collections lies in Riyadh at the King ‘Abd al-‘Aziz Public Library (KAPL). Established in 1985, the KAPL enjoys a growing reputation for the quality of its facilities and collections, the latter ranging from books and manuscripts to coins and photographs. Of particular interest, however, is the library's collection of several hundred maps of Arabia, centered on the 16th to 18th centuries. Since the library's foundation, says Supervisor-General Faisal al-Muaammar, "we were keen to build up a comprehensive collection of maps and charts of Arabia, so that this fascinating material could be made available to scholars and members of the public alike."

The map collection has over 700 rare maps, mostly of the Arabian Peninsular, dating from 1482. These maps are written in English, French, Latin, Italian, German, Dutch, Portuguese, Spanish, Turkish and Arabic. They include examples of some of the greatest cartographers, including Ptolemy, Gastaldi, Ortelius, Munster, Bertius, Hondius, Mercator, Speed, Blaeu, Sanson, Regel, Bowen, Neighbour and Pinkerton.

Women's Library
"Like most other establishments in Saudi Arabia, the Public library is segregated with separate men and women’s sections.  Specifically, the library strives to disseminate knowledge and culture in Saudi society, concentrating on the Arabic and Islamic heritage and the history of the Kingdom of Saudi Arabia and its founder King Abdulaziz.  It seeks to offer a high level of excellence in service in order to meet the expectations of its patrons, answer their needs and earn their satisfaction."

"The first women's library began with the establishment of a women's section attached to the central library at the beginning of A.H.1409 by order of the Custodian of the Two Holy Mosques King Abdullah Bin Abdulaziz, President of the Council of Ministers and Executive Chairman of the Board of the King Abdulaziz Public Library.  This was later transformed into a comprehensive Women's Library which was officially inaugurated on 5/7/A.H.1416.  A branch of the Women's Library was subsequently opened in the King Abdulaziz Historical Center in the Murabba quarter of Riyadh. King Abdulaziz Public Library in Riyadh is very proud of its women's libraries, which are the first public libraries expressly dedicated to women in the Kingdom of Saudi Arabia, equipped with integrated components and employing the techniques of modern information science."

Cooperation
The KAPL has also shared their important and unique collections with other organizations world-wide. "It helps that the exhibition, mounted in partnership with King Abdulaziz Public Library in Riyadh, consists of a wealth of objects, including historic pieces as well as new contemporary art. It has been brought together from different key collections, including the British Museum and the British Library, the Khalili collection, and from sources in Saudi Arabia."

The KAPL has also donated some valuable materials to other libraries. "Alexandria, Egypt, 11 January 2005—The Bibliotheca Alexandrina (BA) has received a valuable donation from the King Abdulaziz Public Library in Saudi Arabia. Dr. Sohair Wastawy, Head of the Library Sector, announced that the donation is of high intellectual and scientific value as it comprises a collection of books, journals and catalogs. They include a book on the principles of library control, Wahet al Tofoola, Wahet al Ma’refa, in addition to a catalog about the first exhibition for the intellectual, scientific and creative outcome of the Saudi woman."

See also
 List of things named after Saudi Kings

References

External links
 King Abdulaziz Public Library - About the Library (Arabic)

1999 establishments in Saudi Arabia
Libraries established in 1999
Libraries in Saudi Arabia
Education in Riyadh